The Tealby Hoard is a hoard of medieval coins found at Tealby, Lincolnshire in 1807.

Discovery
The discovery of the coin hoard was first reported in the Stamford Mercury on 6 November 1807: "a person ploughing...turned up a at one end of a considerable tumulus a coarse glazed earthen pot, which contained about five thousand silver pennies , of Henry I and Henry II". It was followed up with a short article on 20 November which identified that some of the hoard had been deposited at the British Museum and others were in private collections, especially that of Joseph Banks.

Contents
The hoard contained over 6000 silver coins in a Roman waster (a mis-fired) ceramic vessel. The vessel (donated to The Collection, Lincoln in 1956) was over 900 years old when the hoard was deposited. 5127 coins were subsequently melted down at the Tower of London.

The discover of the coins led to the modern description of a type of penny issued by Henry II as the 'Tealby-type'.

References

External links
The Tealby hoard pot – a little waster with a long life

1807 in England
Archaeological sites in Lincolnshire
History of Lincolnshire
1807 archaeological discoveries
Coin hoards
Medieval European objects in the British Museum
Collections of The Collection (Lincolnshire)